The 1979–80 Weber State Wildcats men's basketball team represented Weber State College during the 1979–80 NCAA Division I men's basketball season. Members of the Big Sky Conference, the Wildcats were led by fifth-year head coach Neil McCarthy and played their home games on campus at Dee Events Center in Ogden, Utah.

The sole conference loss was at Idaho, the league runner-up,
which broke an  winning streak and dropped Weber's poll ranking (AP, UPI) from 15 to 17.

The Wildcats appeared in the first five finals of the conference tournament and this was the third consecutive title.

Ranked seventeenth in both major polls, Weber State earned the Big Sky's berth in the expanded 48-team NCAA tournament. They were seeded seventh in the West region and hosted the subregional in Ogden, but were upset by a point by Lamar.

All-conference
Senior guard Bruce Collins was a unanimous selection to the all-conference team, becoming the seventh player to be named in three consecutive years. Joining him for a second straight year was senior forward Richard Johnson. On the second team was senior center Richard Smith and senior guard Mark Mattos; forward Gerald Mattinson and sophomore reserve guard Todd Harper were honorable mention.

A four-year starter, Collins scored over two thousand points for the Wildcats, including 32 in his final game,  the NCAA loss to Lamar. He was edged out for player of the year honors by guard Don Newman of Idaho, which had finished last in each of the previous five seasons.

Postseason results

|-
!colspan=6 style=| Big Sky tournament

|-
!colspan=6 style=| NCAA tournament

References

External links
Sports Reference – Weber State Wildcats: 1979–80 basketball season

Weber State Wildcats men's basketball seasons
Weber State
Weber State